Gold is the fourth studio album by Britt Nicole. It was released on March 26, 2012 and features the Christian radio singles "All This Time", "Stand", and "Ready or Not", as well as her debut mainstream single "Gold". The album was re-released to mainstream markets on February 26, 2013 via Capitol Records, along with a new album cover. In 2014, the song "The Sun Is Rising" was included as part of the soundtrack of the movie The Other Woman, gaining popularity without being an official single.

The album has sold 124,000 copies in the US as of September 2016.

Critical reception

Jared Johnson from Allmusic stated "the third album from contemporary Christian standout Britt Nicole is a laser beam of positivity." Grace S. Aspinwall from CCM Magazine said "the album flows well and includes dance anthems alongside some beautiful ballads." Christian Music Zine's Joshua Andre said "this album has left me literally with no words. Nicole's album is hands down more mature, lyrically and musically sound than her two previous albums combined." Christianity Today stated in an article that "it's a rare thing to find a CCM artist who appeals to top-40 fans, balancing Christian themes with a sound comparable to today's radio hits. Britt Nicole finds the sweet spot with Gold, showcasing catchy dance beats with the star quality of a Disney Channel diva." Andy Cooper from Cross Rhythms said, "This is faith-filled pop bringing a bright hope and an infectious youthful smile to everyone." Indie Vision Music's Jonathan Andre said "this is a terrific album, no dull points. Every song is a reminder that we are precious to God, that He will do anything for us to be with Him. These 13 songs have reminded me that He is always there in the midst of life, shaping and molding us into the people that He wants us to be." Andre wrote "this album incorporates dance, pop, ballads, rap, and every other genre. This album is for everyone, to be reminded that we don’t walk this world alone. Jesus is with us every step of the way and what a sobering thought this is! Isn’t that worth more than all the gold we can have? We are kings and queens of the most High God; let us claim who we are in Christ."

Track listing

iTunes bonus tracks
 Story Behind "All This Time" [Digital Bonus Track]
 Story Behind "Gold" [Digital Bonus Track]

Charts

Weekly charts

Year-end charts

Singles

References

2012 albums
Britt Nicole albums
Sparrow Records albums